Arnovo Selo (in older sources also Arnova Sela) is a settlement in the Municipality of Brežice in eastern Slovenia. It lies in the hills north of the town of Brežice. The area is part of the traditional region of Styria. It is now included in the Lower Sava Statistical Region.

References

External links
Arnovo Selo on Geopedia

Populated places in the Municipality of Brežice